Noureddine Bedoui (born 22 December 1959) is an Algerian politician. He was Prime Minister of Algeria from 11 March 2019 to 19 December 2019.

Biography

Origins and formation 
Noureddine Bedoui was born on 22 December 1959 in Ain Taya, in the wilaya (state) of Algiers, in a family from Ouargla. In 1985, Noureddine Bedoui joined the National School of Administration (ENA) in the promotion Mohamed Laid Al Khalifa. He graduated from it, and later became auditor at the Court of Auditors, then wali (governor) of three different williyas, listed in succession:

 Sidi Bel-Abbés
 Bordj-Bou-Arreridj
 Setif and Constantine

Political career 
Bedoui was Minister of Training and Professional Education from 11 September 2013 to 14 May 2015, before being appointed Minister of the Interior and Local Authorities on 14 May 2015. On 12 March 2019, he became Prime Minister, after the resignation of Ahmed Ouyahia and the withdrawal of Abdelaziz Bouteflika in the presidential election, as a result of mass demonstrations. On 14 March, the formation of the government was announced for the end of next week. The deadline was largely exceeded. The government was finally formed on 31 March. Two days later, on 2 April, President Abdelaziz Bouteflika resigned. Bedoui and his government later resigned as Prime Minister on December 19, 2019.

References 

  

1959 births
Living people
People from Algiers Province
Prime Ministers of Algeria
Interior ministers of Algeria
21st-century Algerian people